Syrym is a district of West Kazakhstan Region in western Kazakhstan. The administrative center of the district is the auyl of Zhympity. Population:

History
It was formed as the Dzhambeytinsky district. In 1992, it was renamed Syrymsky district in honor of batyr Syrym Datov.

Geography
Syrym District lies in a flat area north of the Caspian Depression. The Buldyrty (Бұлдырты) and Olenti rivers flow across the territory of the district.

References

Districts of Kazakhstan
West Kazakhstan Region